"Burning Man" is a song written by Bobby Pinson and Luke Dick and recorded by American country music singer Dierks Bentley as a collaboration with American country music duo Brothers Osborne. It was released in May 2018 as the second single from Bentley's 2018 album The Mountain.

History
Co-writer Luke Dick said of the song, "The chorus is the idea of being a walking contradiction in some regards. There is — especially for artistic types‚ the feeling of wanting to wander or be out in the world, but also the desire to be grounded in some way too". This "contradiction" is expressed in the lyric "I'm a little bit holy water but still a little bit burning man." He said that he did not have the idea until he began to write songs with Bobby Pinson, and after completing the song, the two chose to offer it to Bentley. Bentley said that he felt an "immediate connection" to the lyrics upon hearing the song, and that he identified with its theme of having contradictory elements to one's personality, given his own life as both a touring musician and a father.

The duo Brothers Osborne is featured on the track: T.J. Osborne provides duet vocals, while John Osborne plays lead guitar. Bentley said that he wanted to include an artist who was comparatively younger, and that when he sent a text message to the brothers asking if they wanted to record, they responded in only two minutes.

Commercial performance
Burning Man peaked at No. 5 on Billboards Hot Country Songs, and No. 2 on Country Airplay (No. 1 on Mediabase), for charts dated February 2, 2019. The song has sold 149,000 copies in the United States as of March 2019.

Music video
The song's music video was directed by Wes Edwards. It features Bentley and the Brothers Osborne performing the song near the Salton Sea, interspersed with touring footage. According to Bentley, several crew members suffered heatstroke while filming the video.

Personnel
From The Mountain liner notes.

 Alan Bradbury – background vocals
 Dierks Bentley – lead and background vocals
 Matt Chamberlain – drums, percussion
 Luke Dick – acoustic guitar, electric guitar, background vocals, percussion, programming
 Ian Fitchuk – bass guitar, keyboards
 Jedd Hughes – acoustic guitar, electric guitar
 Rob McNelley – electric guitar
 Tim O'Brien – background vocals, fiddle
 John Osborne – electric guitar
 T. J. Osborne – lead vocals
 F. Reid Shippen – bass synthesizer

Charts

Weekly charts

Year-end charts

Certifications

References

2018 songs
2018 singles
Dierks Bentley songs
Brothers Osborne songs
Vocal collaborations
Capitol Records Nashville singles
Song recordings produced by Ross Copperman
Music videos directed by Wes Edwards
Songs written by Bobby Pinson
Songs written by Luke Dick